Jake Taylor may refer to:

People 
 Jake Taylor (footballer, born 1991), Welsh footballer for Stevenage
 Jake Taylor (footballer, born 1998), English footballer for Port Vale
 Jake Taylor (ice hockey) (born 1983), American ice hockey defenseman
 Jake Taylor, lead singer of the Australian band In Hearts Wake

Fictional 
 Jake Taylor, portrayed by Tom Berenger in films Major League and Major League II
 Jake Taylor, portrayed by Joshua Jackson in the film Cursed
 Jake Taylor, portrayed by Randy Wayne in the film To Save a Life
 Jake Taylor, a fictional character of Nan's Christmas Carol
 Jake Taylor, portrayed by Charley Grapewin in the film Atlantic City
 Jake Taylor, portrayed by Jordan Fisher in the film Work It
 Jake Taylor, portrayed by Adam Demos in the film Falling Inn Love